This is a detailed list of tumuli (barrows) in Serbia, ranging from the prehistoric times to the Middle Ages.

Mrčajevci, several prehistoric tumuli
Bukovac, Illyrian tumuli and necropolis
Five prehistoric tumuli in the Morava valley.
Serbian tumuli in Ravna Gora.
Kinđa

References 

Lists of buildings and structures in Serbia
Archaeology of Serbia
Archaeology-related lists
Serbia
Tumuli